Ben Freha is a town and commune in Oran Province, Algeria. According to the 1998 census it has a population of 14565.

References

Communes of Oran Province